Łukasz Grzeszczyk (born 29 July 1987) is a Polish professional footballer who plays as an attacking midfielder for Górnik Łęczna.

External links
 

1987 births
Living people
People from Ostrołęka
Sportspeople from Masovian Voivodeship
Polish footballers
Wisła Płock players
Znicz Pruszków players
Widzew Łódź players
Warta Poznań players
GKS Bełchatów players
Sandecja Nowy Sącz players
GKS Tychy players
Górnik Łęczna players
Ekstraklasa players
I liga players
II liga players
Association football midfielders